Blaine Thomas Boyer (born July 11, 1981) is an American former professional baseball pitcher. He played in MLB for the Atlanta Braves, St. Louis Cardinals, Arizona Diamondbacks, New York Mets, Minnesota Twins, San Diego Padres, Milwaukee Brewers, Boston Red Sox and Kansas City Royals. He also played in Nippon Professional Baseball (NPB) for the Hanshin Tigers.

Baseball career
Boyer attended George Walton Comprehensive High School in Marietta, Georgia. The Atlanta Braves selected him in the third round of the 2000 Major League Baseball draft. His first season of pro baseball was with the rookie league team the Gulf Coast Braves, where he went 1–3 with a 2.51 Earned run average (ERA).

Atlanta Braves

Boyer went 4–5 with a 4.52 ERA and 57 strikeouts with the Danville Braves in 2001. The next year, he played with the Class A team the Macon Braves and led the bullpen with 73 strikeouts.

In 2003, Boyer stayed with the Macon Braves when they moved to Rome. That year he finished fifth in the league in wins with 12, and led the team in wins. He finished the year with a 12–8 record and a 3.69 ERA. He also recorded a minor-league career-high 115 strikeouts.

In 2004, Boyer played with Class A Myrtle Beach. He led the Carolina League with 154 innings pitched and was selected to the Carolina League All-Star team. He was elected the Carolina League Pitcher of the Week for the week of May 3 by The Sports Network.

On June 12, 2005, Boyer was called up to the major leagues directly from the AA Mississippi Braves, and made his debut that day against the Oakland Athletics. He went 4–1 with a 2.05 ERA in 23 games at Atlanta's home field, Turner Field. In Boyer's first season, playing for the Atlanta Braves as a midseason call-up, he went 4–2 with a 3.11 ERA in 37.2 innings. The following two seasons, he spent the majority of the time in the minors, collecting just 7 appearances total. 

On May 14, 2008, Boyer pitched 1.1 innings to record his first Major League save, against the Philadelphia Phillies. He played a career high 76 games, posting an ERA of 5.88 in 72 innings. He was designated for assignment the following season.

St.Louis Cardinals
On April 20, 2009, Boyer was traded to the St. Louis Cardinals for Brian Barton. On June 4, Boyer was designated for assignment. In 15 games for the Cardinals, he had a 4.41 ERA.

Arizona Diamondbacks
On June 8, 2009, Boyer was claimed by the Arizona Diamondbacks. He pitched stellar for the D'Backs for the remainder of the 2009 season, posting a 2.68 ERA in 30 games. He remained with the team the following season, appearing in 54 games.

New York Mets

Boyer signed a minor league contract with the New York Mets on January 21, 2011. The deal included an invitation to spring training. On April 10, 2011, Boyer was designated for assignment.

Pittsburgh Pirates
Boyer signed a minor league contract with the Pittsburgh Pirates on April 20, 2011. He was released on June 18.

Return to St. Louis
Boyer signed a minor league contract with the St. Louis Cardinals on July 5, 2011. He was assigned to the Triple-A Memphis Redbirds. He was released on August 13, after allowing 26 runs in 16 innings for Memphis.

Kansas City Royals
Boyer retired from baseball in 2012. He returned to baseball the next year, when he signed a minor league contract with the Kansas City Royals on January 3, 2013. He was released in May.

Hanshin Tigers

Boyer subsequently signed with the Hanshin Tigers of Nippon Professional Baseball after his release from Kansas City.

San Diego Padres
Boyer signed a minor league deal with the San Diego Padres on January 9, 2014. His contract was selected from the Triple-A El Paso Chihuahuas on May 22. He was designated for assignment on May 25, and outrighted back to El Paso on May 27. He was called back up on June 15. He became a free agent after the season.

Minnesota Twins

On January 7, 2015, Boyer signed a minor league contract with the Minnesota Twins. The team announced that Boyer had made the Opening Day roster on March 30. For the entire season, Boyer posted a career low 2.49 ERA in 68 games for the Twins.

Milwaukee Brewers
On February 12, 2016, Boyer signed a minor league contract with the Milwaukee Brewers with an invitation to spring training, and made the Opening Day roster with a contract worth $950,000. He appeared In 61 games for the Brewers, posting an ERA of 3.95 with a 2–4 record.

Return to Atlanta
Boyer signed a minor league contract with the Atlanta Braves on January 17, 2017. He was released on March 25.

Boston Red Sox
On April 3, 2017, Boyer signed a minor league deal with the Boston Red Sox. The Red Sox called up Boyer on May 28 2017.

Return to Kansas City
On February 7, 2018, Boyer signed a minor league deal with the Kansas City Royals. His contract was purchased by the Royals on March 29, 2018. He appeared in 21 games, going 2–1 with a 12.05 ERA, before he was released on August 15, 2018.

Personal life
Boyer is married to Ginsey, with whom he has two sons. In November 2015, working with non-profit group The Exodus Road, Boyer spent ten days undercover with former MLB first baseman (and his former Braves teammate) Adam LaRoche, helping to identify and rescue underage sex slaves in Southeast Asia.

References

External links

1981 births
Living people
Baseball players from Marietta, Georgia
Major League Baseball pitchers
American expatriate baseball players in Japan
Atlanta Braves players
St. Louis Cardinals players
Arizona Diamondbacks players
New York Mets players
Hanshin Tigers players
San Diego Padres players
Minnesota Twins players
Milwaukee Brewers players
Boston Red Sox players
Kansas City Royals players
Gulf Coast Braves players
Danville Braves players
Macon Braves players
Rome Braves players
Myrtle Beach Pelicans players
Mississippi Braves players
Richmond Braves players
Reno Aces players
Indianapolis Indians players
Palm Beach Cardinals players
Memphis Redbirds players
Omaha Storm Chasers players
El Paso Chihuahuas players
Pawtucket Red Sox players